Clifford Joseph "Fido" Purpur (September 26, 1914 – February 21, 2001) was an American ice hockey player who played five seasons in the National Hockey League for the St. Louis Eagles, Chicago Black Hawks, and Detroit Red Wings between 1934 and 1945. He also played several years of minor hockey, primarily with the St. Louis Flyers of the American Hockey Association. After retiring he became a coach, and led the University of North Dakota from 1949 to 1956.

Career
Purpur played for the Minneapolis Millers winning a CHL championship in 1934 and went on to play 25 games for the St. Louis Eagles the following season becoming the first person born in North Dakota to play in the National Hockey League. After the Eagles folded the players were disbanded to other NHL teams and Purpur was selected by Toronto. If the NHL ever resold the franchise, proceeds were to go to the Ottawa Hockey Association. Rather than join the Leafs Purpur remained in Missouri and signed on with the AHA's St. Louis Flyers. Purpur played the next six seasons with the Flyers, winning 38 regular season titles and 4 league championships while being one of the top scorers for the team. In 1941 Purpur left St. Louis and joined the Kansas City Americans but received a brief call-up for his second stint in the NHL for the Chicago Black Hawks. In 78 games Purpur recorded no points and he was returned to Kansas City for the remainder of the year.

Due to America's entry into World War II several NHL rosters were depleted of talent and the league scrambled to find replacements. Chicago brought Purpur back and this time he was able to play a full 50-game season, posting 13 goals and 16 assists but Chicago missed out on the playoffs by 1 point when the lost the final two games of the year. Purpur was finally able to make his playoff debut for the Black hawks the next year and, while his team made the finals, they were swept out by the Montreal Canadiens. Purpur split his time in 1944-45 between Chicago and Indianapolis of the newly-formed AHL but after the Capitals bowed out in the first round of the playoffs Purpur made his final appearance in the NHL by appearing in seven playoff games for the Detroit Red Wings. with the war over in 1945 Purpur returned to the minors and finished his playing career in 1947.

Coaching career
A few years after retiring Purpur returned to North Dakota to take over the program at UND. Purpur would spend seven seasons with the Fighting Sioux and shepherded the team through the early years of conference play. His best season came in 1952–53 with a 15-5 record and a third-place finish in the MCHL. He was inducted into the United States Hockey Hall of Fame in 1974 and was awarded North Dakota's highest honor, the Roughrider Award in 1981. During his coaching career, Purpur coached his younger brother Ken. In 1988, he received the Hobey Baker Legends of College Hockey Award.

Career statistics

Regular season and playoffs

Head coaching record

References

External links

1914 births
2001 deaths
Chicago Blackhawks players
Detroit Red Wings players
Ice hockey people from North Dakota
Sportspeople from Grand Forks, North Dakota
St. Louis Eagles players
United States Hockey Hall of Fame inductees
North Dakota Fighting Hawks men's ice hockey coaches
American men's ice hockey right wingers